The 2002 Macau Grand Prix (formally the 49th Macau Grand Prix) was a motor race for Formula Three cars that was held on the streets of Macau on  17 November 2002. Unlike other races, such as the Masters of Formula 3, the 2002 Macau Grand Prix was not a part of any Formula Three championship, but was open to entries from all Formula Three championships. The race was divided into two 15-lap aggregate legs: the first was held in the morning and the second took place in the afternoon. The overall winner was the driver who completed all 30 laps in the shortest amount of time. The 2002 event was the 49th running of the Macau Grand Prix and the 20th for Formula Three cars.

The Grand Prix was won by ASM Formule 3 driver Tristan Gommendy, having finished second in the first leg which Paolo Montin of TOM'S won. Montin lost the lead to Fortec Motorsport's Heikki Kovalainen at the start of the second leg. He held it until Gommendy in the faster car caught and passed Kovalainen at Lisboa corner after a restart on lap 12 and maintained the lead to win the race. Kovalainen took second position and the outright podium was completed by Takashi Kogure for the Mugen x Dome Project team.

Background and entry list
The Macau Grand Prix is a Formula Three race considered to be a stepping stone to higher motor racing categories such as Formula One and has been termed the territory's most prestigious international sporting event. The 2002 Macau Grand Prix was the 49th running of the event and the 20th time the race was held to Formula Three regulations. It took place on the  22-turn Guia Circuit on 17 November 2002 with three preceding days of practice and qualifying.

In order to compete in Macau, drivers had to compete in a Fédération Internationale de l'Automobile (FIA)-regulated championship race during the calendar year, in one of the seven national Formula Three championships that took place during the calendar year, with the highest-placed drivers given priority in receiving an invitation to the race. Within the 30 car grid for Macau, four of the five major Formula Three series were represented by their respective champion. Robbie Kerr, the British champion, was joined in Macau by French title winner Tristan Gommendy, Italian victor Miloš Pavlović and All-Japan Formula Three winner Takashi Kogure. The only major winner of a Formula Three championship not to compete in Macau for undisclosed reasons was the German champion Gary Paffett. Three competitors who did not take part in any Formula Three championship in 2002 received invitations from race organisers to enter the Macau Grand Prix. They were local Macanese drivers Jo Merszei, Michael Ho and Kit Meng Lei.

Practice and qualifying
A total of two one hour practice sessions preceded the race on Sunday: one on Thursday morning and one on Friday morning. The first practice session held in hot, humid weather was delayed for ten minutes due to circuit officials repairing a tyre wall at Lisboa corner after practice for the local ACMC Trophy Race. Paolo Montin of TOM'S lapped fastest with a time of 2 minutes, 17.798 seconds in the session's closing seconds. The rest of the top ten were Yuji Ide, Gommendy, Narain Karthikeyan, Bruce Jouanny, Heikki Kovalainen, Robert Doornbos, Kosuke Matsuura, Pavlović and James Courtney. Katsuyuki Hiranaka blocked the track at the Melco hairpin when he became stranded across the turn until marshals got his car facing correctly. Fábio Carbone entered the corner too fast but he braked early to avoid a crash. Kerr hit the barrier at Fisherman's Bend and damaged his car's suspension and rear wing. Vitantonio Liuzzi went off the track and removed his car's left-hand corner.

Qualifying was divided into two 45-minute sessions; the first was held on Thursday afternoon, and the second on Friday afternoon. The fastest time set by each driver from either session counted towards their final starting position for Sunday's race. Matsuura led the first qualifying session with a time of 2 minutes, 15.768 seconds set in its closing seconds. Ide waited until his final lap to claim provisional second and was eight-tenths of a second slower. Courtney pushed hard on his final timed lap to be the highest-placed rookie in third. Montin had provisional pole position before dropping to fourth and going down the escape road at Lisboa corner. The unwell Kovalainen was as high as second but came fifth. Gommendy could not claim provisional pole position as he collided with a barrier leaving Reservoir bend with five minutes to go and bent his left-rear wheel bearing. Karthikeyan was seventh, Doornbos eighth. The French duo of Olivier Pla and Johanny rounded out the top ten. Renaud Derlot was the quickest driver not to enter the top ten. Following him were Richard Antinucci, Kogure and Pavlović, Marcel Costa, Carbone, Hiranaka, Alan van der Merwe, Hiroki Yoshimoto, César Campaniço, Ho, Lee, Tatsuya Kataoka, Kerr, Liuzzi, Cristiano Citron, Shinya Sato, Lei and Merszei. The only driver not to set a lap time was Ronnie Bremer due to a crash at San Francisco Bend turn. Yoshimoto and his fellow Japanese Kataoka glanced a wall beside the track. Yellow and oil flags were needed for Van Der Merwe's accident into a barrier at Dona Maria Bend corner. Kit Meng's subsequent heavy accident left debris on the track and stopped the session for two minutes.

In the second 30-minute practice session, Jouanny set an early lap that was good enough to lead the field until Montin improved it. A short rain shower fell on parts of the circuit and several drivers aquaplaned on the wet surface as they returned to the pit lane. They waited for the circuit to sufficiently dry before venturing back onto it. Ide was briefly fastest before Karthikeyan and later Montin occupied first. Ultimately, it was Gommendy who was fastest with a lap of 2 minutes, 16.569 seconds despite a spin and lightly damaging his car's left-hand corner at Dona Maria Bend. He was followed by Kovalainen, Montin, Pla, Ide, Campaniço, Courtney (driving with a misfiring engine), Karthikeyan, Carbone and Kerr. Late in the session, Pla lost control of his car and made minor contact with the barrier.

The start of the second qualifying session was delayed for 35 minutes due to multiple accidents in the Guia Race of Macau's third practice session that left cement dust, oil and debris to be cleared by marshals. A suggestion in the paddock that second qualifying was reduced to half an hour was dispelled and the full 45 minutes were held. Several drivers immediately began improving their laps and Montin led with a 2 minutes, 14.995 seconds lap in the 14th minute to displace Matsuura. He held it to claim pole position for the first time on his fifth appearance in Macau. Gommendy's team adjusted his car and he joined Montin on the grid's front row in spite of him crashing into a wall on his last try at going quicker and prematurely ending the session with 1 minute and 50 seconds left. Matsuura was the only driver in the top 26 not to improve his lap time and car problems left him third. Kovalainen moved to fourth and Karthikeyan got to fifth. Pla was the best-starting rookie in sixth. Carbone was as high as fourth before coming seventh and Ide fell six places from his provisional grid slot to start eighth. Rounding out the top ten were Jouanny and Hiranaka. Behind them the rest of the field consisted of Antinucci, Doornbos, Courtney, Bremer, Kogure, Kerr, Campaniço, Pavlović, Van Der Merwe, Costa, Derlot, Yoshimoto, Kataoka, Liuzzi, Lee, Citron, Ho, Sato, Lei and Merszei. The session's only other disruption came as Bremer entered the outside of the Reservoir bend and lost control of his car. He crashed sideways into a barrier and inflicted heavy damage to his vehicle's left-hand corner and suspension.

Qualifying classification
Each of the driver's fastest lap times from the two qualifying sessions are denoted in bold.

Warm-up
A 20-minute warm-up session was held on the morning of the race. Montin set the session's fastest lap of 2 minutes, 14.494 seconds. Karthikeyan was four-hundredths of a second slower in second and Carbone was third. Kataoka was fourth-fastest; his fellow Japanese Kogure was fifth and Doornbos sixth. Kerr was seventh-quickest, Costa eighth and the Japanese duo of Ide and Hiranaka were ninth and tenth.

Race
Sunday's race was divided into two aggregate legs lasting a total of 30 laps. The first 15-lap leg was held in the morning and the results of that leg determined the starting order of the second with the winner starting from pole position. Afterwards, a five-hour interval was observed to allow for the intervening support races to occur. The second 15-lap leg took place later in the afternoon. The overall winner of the Grand Prix was the driver who won the second leg provided they had completed all 30 laps in the shortest possible time.

Leg 1
The start of the first leg was scheduled for 10:20 Macau Standard Time (UTC+08:00) on 17 November but it was delayed for five minutes due to several incidents during the Macau Asian Formula 2000 Challenge round that made the track dirty. When it did begin in dry and cloudy conditions, Gommendy overtook Montin for the lead as the field approached Mandarin Oriental Bend for the first time. A slow start dropped Kovalainen to fifth as Gommendy lost the lead to Montin on the outside into Lisboa corner. Gommendy then made a minor error and allowed Matsuura into second. At Lisboa turn, Hiranaka appeared to lightly hit the wall and ricocheted into Pla's path. Pla swerved to avoid him but had no space to negotiate through and crashed. That caught out Pavlović, Derlot, Courtney, Van Der Merwe, Merszei and Kataoka. The safety car was deployed and track marshals worked to move the wrecked cars that were involved in the accident. Costa made a pit stop during the second lap as the rest of the field drove behind the safety car at reduced speed until it was withdrawn at the conclusion of the fourth lap.

After the safety car was withdrawn, Montin made a brisk restart to keep the lead from Matsuura. Gommendy then was challenged by Karthikeyan. Further down the field, the faster Doornbos passed Carbone for eighth. The consequence of the safety car brought cars close together but they were more calm than before in spite of localised yellow flags in various areas. Gommendy fell behind Matsuura and tried to repass only for the Japanese to retain his hold on third. Gommendy tried again and overtook Matsuura for third. At this point, Kovalainen set the fastest lap and overtook Karthikeyan for fourth. Doornbos overtook Jouanny for seventh and Kovalainen passed Matsuura into Lisboa corner for third. However, Mastuura clung onto the slipstream of Kovalainen's car and returned to third place. Although Kerr passed Carbone for ninth, he made contact with the barrier and lost positions. Karthikeyan drew closer to Kovalainen as the faster Gommendy closed up to Montin. Lei's slower car delayed Montin and Gommendy had Matsuura, Kovalainen, Karthikeyan, Ide and Doornbos close by.

Kovalainen could not find a way past Matsuura until he overtook him at Lisboa corner and Karthikeyan's subsequent pass was blocked by Matsuura. On lap nine, Bremer drove off the track at Lisboa corner and crashed. The following lap, Karthikeyan passed Matsuura and Kogure fell behind Carbone. Montin had now lapped Lei and tried to pull away from Gommendy with a series of fastest laps. Kovalainen lost control of his car on an uphill section from San Francisco Bend and damaged his car's rear wing in a spin. Kovalainen's steering arm was damaged and he lost fourth to Karthikeyan. Carbone was passed by Campaniço for twelfth as Ide overtook Matsuura for fifth. Doornbos put Matsuura under heavy pressure but he was not successful in getting past. Montin held the lead for the rest of the race to win the first leg and began the second from pole position. He was joined on the grid's front row by Gommendy. The final classified finishers were Karthikeyan, Kovalainen, Ide, Matsuura, Doornbos, Jouanny, Antinucci, Kerr, Kogure, Campaniço, Carbone, Costa, Yoshimoto, Lee, Hiranaka, Citron, Sato, Ho and Lei.

Leg 2
The second leg of the race started later that day at 15:40 local time in cloudy and dry weather. For the second successive leg, the driver who started from pole position lost the lead as Montin narrowly avoided stalling his car and elevated Kovalainen to first place and Ide overtook Gommendy for second. Jouanny hit the armco barrier at Lisboa turn and ricocheted across the circuit. Kerr could not avoid him despite turning right and ran into his car. Carbone was also collected and the accident prompted the safety car's deployment for debris clearing by marshals. When the safety car was withdrawn on lap three, Kovalainen fended off a challenge from Ide on the run to Mandarin Oriental Bend to hold the lead. Kovalainen began to pull clear from the rest of the field. Lei went off the track at Lisboa corner but restarted his car so he could continue driving. Doornbos did the same on the next lap and also returned to the track without damaging his car. In the meantime, Montin attacked Kogure and Ide was under pressure from Gommendy whom was passed by Karthikeyan but Gommendy retook his former position soon after.

Karthikeyan crashed into the wall leaving Maternity Bend corner and retired on the fourth lap. Although Kovalainen was continuing to pull away with a series of fastest laps, Ide later responded to his pace and Kovalainen did the same by increasing his lead at the front to half a second. Gommendy was then close by Ide and passed him for second on lap eight at Mandarin Oriental Bend. Meanwhile, Costa overtook Campaniço on the straight and the latter removed his front wing in a collision with the wall at Lisboa corner after Costa's pass surprised him. At the front Kovalainen again tried to establish a small lead when Gommendy drew close to him due to a more powerful engine. On lap nine, Ide had third taken from him by fellow Japanese Matsuura as the two avoided a collision into Lisboa turn. Ide drove onto the turn's escape road after unsuccessfully blocking Matsuura due to the momentum of the latter's overtake. Matsuura continued until he spun at Dona Maria Bend and retired after a crash against the wall. This promoted Montin to third but the incident prompted the safety car's second deployment.

At the restart on lap 12, Gommendy used the safety car's withdrawal to overtake Kovalainen for the lead at Lisboa corner. Montin sought a way past Kogure for third though Kogure blocked the pass. That caused Montin to spin at Lisboa turn and Antinucci and then Ide collected him. All three drivers retired as a result. Kovalainen locked his tyres heavily and Kogure got past him for second. However, Kogure did not keep second for long as Kovalainen retook the position but was now out of contention to win. Thus, Gommendy led the rest of the leg to win the race overall. Kovalainen finished 2.104 seconds behind in second and Kogure completed the podium in third. Off the podium, Hiranaka, Yoshimoto, Doornbos, Lee, Citron, Ho and Campaniço completed the top ten. Sato and Lei were the final classified finishers. Overall, 17 out of the 30 entered cars were not classified in the final results.

Race classification

References

External links
 
 

Macau Grand Prix
2002 in Formula Three
Grand
Macau